Eucosma hennei, or Henne's eucosman moth, is a species of moth of the family Tortricidae. Specimens have been recovered in the El Segundo sand dunes in California The habitat includes open sand, undisturbed sand dunes and dense shrubs populated with the larval host plant Phacelia.

References

External links 
 tortricidae.com
 Eucosma at BugGuide.Net

Eucosmini
Moths described in 1947